The Valdostan regional election of 1959 took place on 17 May 1959.

The Valdostan Union sought a revenge for the previous election, it allied with the left and won.

Results
Electoral system: limited voting (jackpot for winners: 25 seats)

Sources: Regional Council of Aosta Valley and Istituto Cattaneo

Elections in Aosta Valley
1959 elections in Italy